The Bay of Vlorë ( — ) is a large bay of the Adriatic Sea situated along the Albanian Adriatic Sea Coast on the Mediterranean Sea in Southern Europe. It opens to the sea in the northwest and is largely surrounded by the lagoon of Narta in the north, the city of Vlorë in the northeast, the mountains of the Ceraunians in the east and southeast, and the peninsula of Karaburun in the southwest and west.

Biodiversity
The bay is categorized as an Important Bird and Plant Area by virtue of it provides excellent habitats for a vast array of bird and plant species.

Geography
The Karaburun Peninsula, which stretches at the meetingpoint of the Adriatic and Ionian Sea, encompasses the western shoreline of the bay that is highly hilly and irregular in structure and is home to the Karaburun-Sazan Marine Park.

History
In classical antiquity the Bay of Vlorë constituted the southern limit of the Illyrian coast. The Bay is delimited by the mountainous area of the Karaburun Peninsula (ancient Akrokeraunia) to the southwest and the Ceraunian Mountains to the south, which represented a natural frontier separating Illyria from Epirus. The coastal area of the Bay was settled by Ancient Greek colonists, who traditionally founded Oricum, Thronion and Aulon. Illyrians were found in the hinterland of the Bay. The area at the foot of the Akrokeraunian Mountains including the Dukat plain in the south of the Bay was inhabited by the southernmost Illyrians, while Chaones and their territory, Chaonia, were located to the south of the Akrokeraunia.

In Roman times, the region was a significant place and was the scene, for example, of some of Caesar's battles. It has been suggested that Julius Caesar landed inside the Bay of Vlorë from Brundusium across the Adriatic, in order to carry on the Civil War against Pompey in Illyricum and the oncoming Battle of Dyrrhachium on 10 July 48 BC. Ptolemy mentions Aulon (Vlorë), locating it in Taulantian territory.

In one account, 18 ships full of merchandise have sunk in the Bay. Studying the Bay of Vlorë, it has been one of the main projects of the navigation department of the University of Vlora in the last few years.
The southwestern end of the Bay, at the naval base of Pashaliman, has been used as a harbor since antiquity. The city was called Oricum. During the Cold War, it was temporarily a Soviet naval base, the only one in the Mediterranean sea.

See also  
 Biodiversity of Albania
 Geography of Albania
 Protected areas of Albania

References

Bibliography

Bays of Albania
Bays of the Mediterranean
Bodies of water of Albania
Important Bird Areas of Albania
Albanian Adriatic Sea Coast